Luna E-6 No.2, also identified as No.1, and sometimes known in the West as Sputnik 25, was a Soviet spacecraft which launched in 1963, but was placed into a useless orbit due to a problem with the upper stage of the rocket that launched it. It was a  Luna Ye-6 spacecraft, the first of twelve to be launched. It was intended to be the first spacecraft to perform a soft landing on the Moon, a goal which would eventually be accomplished by the final Ye-6 spacecraft, Luna 9.

Luna E-6 No.2 was launched at 08:49 UTC on 4 January 1963, atop a Molniya-L 8K78L carrier rocket, flying from Site 1/5 at the Baikonur Cosmodrome. The lower stages of the rocket performed nominally, delivering the upper stage and payload into low Earth orbit, but a transformer in the upper stage malfunctioned, which resulted in its ullage motors failing to ignite when the stage began its start-up sequence, sixty-six minutes after launch. It remained in low Earth orbit until it decayed on 11 January 1963. It was the first spacecraft to be launched in 1963, and consequently the first to be assigned an International Designator, under the new system which had been introduced at the start of the year.

The spacecraft consisted of a cylindrical section containing rockets and fuel for maneuvering, attitude control and landing, as well as radio transmitters, and a  instrumented probe, which would have been ejected onto the surface after the spacecraft landed, carrying a camera and devices to measure radiation. It was intended to return data on the mechanical characteristics of the lunar surface, the hazards presented by the topology--such as craters, rocks, and other obstructions--and radiation, in preparation for future crewed landings.

The designations Sputnik 33, and later Sputnik 25 were used by the United States Naval Space Command to identify the spacecraft in its Satellite Situation Summary documents, since the Soviet Union did not release the internal designations of its spacecraft at that time, and had not assigned it an official name due to its failure to depart geocentric orbit.

References

Spacecraft launched in 1963
Luna programme
1963 in the Soviet Union
Spacecraft which reentered in 1963